Pierre Archambault is a judge who has served on the Tax Court of Canada since March 24, 1993.

References

Living people
Judges of the Tax Court of Canada
Year of birth missing (living people)
Place of birth missing (living people)
20th-century Canadian judges